Action-Refraction  is the tenth album by American bassist Ben Allison. It was released on the Palmetto Records label in 2011. It's his first album to focus on the compositions of others.

Critical reception
In a review for AllMusic, critic reviewer Phil Freeman wrote: "Action-Refraction isn't a straight jazz album, but it's more likely to appeal to young jazz listeners than to indie rock fans, though it offers pleasures for anyone with open ears."

Track list

Personnel
 Michael Blake – tenor saxophone, bass clarinet
 Jason Lindner – Prophet 08 analog synthesizer, piano
 Steve Cardenas – guitar
 Brandon Seabrook – guitar (tracks 3,7)
 Ben Allison – bass
 Rudy Royston – drums

References

External links
 BenAllison.com - Music

2011 albums
Ben Allison albums
Palmetto Records albums